Fabio Coala is a Brazilian comics artist. After five years of working as firefighter, he created the website Mentirinhas ("Little Lies") in which he publishes, starting in 2010, webcomics with different characters. One of the main characters is "O Monstro" ("The Monster"), a toy monster that helps children with problems by becoming a real monster for them. The first Monster's printed graphic novel was released in 2013 after a successful crowdfunding campaign and, in the following year, the book won the Troféu HQ Mix (most important Brazilian comic related award) in the category "Best Independent Publication". A Coala's comic strip called "Perfeição" ("Perfection") was also adapted in 2014 as a short animated movie by Jacob Frey and Markus Kranzler. The movie, called The Present, has won 77 awards from several film festivals and has garnered critical acclaim.

References 

Living people
Brazilian comics artists
Year of birth missing (living people)